This is a record of Israel at the 2005 World Championships in Athletics.

Men's marathon

Women's marathon

Men's javelin throw

Qualification - Group B

Nations at the 2005 World Championships in Athletics
World Championships in Athletics
2005